Bob DiSpirito (August 9, 1928 – December 21, 2015) was an American football player and coach. He played college football at the University of Rhode Island, lettering in 1950. He served as the head football coach at the University of Bridgeport from 1960 to 1964. DiSpirito was the head football coach at Slippery Rock University of Pennsylvania from 1967 to 1980 and again on an interim basis during the 1987 seasons.

References

1928 births
2015 deaths
Bridgeport Purple Knights football coaches
Rhode Island Rams football players
Slippery Rock football coaches
People from Woonsocket, Rhode Island
Players of American football from Rhode Island